W.A.K.O. World Championships 1985 London were the joint fifth world kickboxing championships hosted by the W.A.K.O. organization arranged by British karate master Joe Johal – who had been made W.A.K.O. president earlier that year.  The organization was facing some turmoil at the time with it splitting into two separate factions due to political differences which meant there were two separate world championships being held – with an event in Budapest that very same weekend.   These political differences would, however, be resolved the following year and the organization would come back together.  It was the second world championships to be held in the city of London and third overall (the Europeans had been held in 1980, the worlds in 1983).

The event was open to amateur men, and for the first time ever, women were allowed to compete (as they would in Budapest event also).  The men had three categories, Full-Contact, Semi-Contact and the newly introduced Musical Forms (which had been unofficially part of the W.A.K.O. World Championships 1981).  In contrast, the women had just the one category; Semi-Contact.  Each country had one competitor per weight division in men's Full-Contact and Semi-Contact, although some competitors in the men's events competed in two different categories, while the women's Semi-Contact and men's Musical Forms categories were allowed more than one participant per country due to limited numbers.  By the end of the championships, the top nation were West Germany, narrowly shading the USA by virtue of an extra silver, with host nation Great Britain behind in third.  The event was held at the Wembley Centre in London, England, UK, on Saturday, 2 November 1985.

Men's Full-Contact Kickboxing

In the men's Full-Contact category there were ten weight classes ranging from 54 kg/118.8 lbs to over 91 kg/+200.2 lbs, with the two heaviest divisions being similar to the 1983 world championships and slightly heavier than the last Europeans.  All bouts were fought under Full-Contact rules with more detail on the rules being provided at the W.A.K.O. website – although be aware that the rules may have changed slightly since 1985.  Notable winners included regular winner Ferdinand Mack who moved up to the 75 kg division to win his sixth gold at a W.A.K.O. championships (world and European) and future boxing world champion Troy Dorsey who would also win gold at the same event in the Semi-Contact category.  At the end of the championships West Germany was the comfortable leader in Full-Contact winning an impressive six golds, one silver and one bronze.

Men's Full-Contact Kickboxing Medals Table

Semi-Contact Kickboxing

Semi-Contact differed from Full-Contact in that fighters were won by points given due to technique, skill and speed, with physical force limited – more information on Semi-Contact can be found on the W.A.K.O. website, although the rules will have changed since 1985.  There were also less divisions in men's Semi-Contact with slightly different weight classes ranging from 57 kg/125.4 lbs to over 84 kg/+184.8 lbs.  The most notable winner was future boxing world champion Troy Dorsey who also won a gold medal in Full-Contact at the same event.  The USA was the top nation in men's Semi-Contact winning four golds and two bronze medals.  

Also, for the first time ever women were allowed to compete at a W.A.K.O. championships.  The only category on offer was Semi-Contact with just four weight divisions ranging from 50 kg/110 lbs to over 60 kg/132 lbs.  Due to the somewhat smaller amount of nations competing some nations were allowed more than one competitor per weight division.  By the end of the championships West Germany was the strongest nation in women's Semi-Contact beating off a spirited show by Scotland by winning two golds and one silver medal.

Men's Semi-Contact Kickboxing Medals Table

Women's Semi-Contact Kickboxing Medals Table

Men's Musical Forms

Musical Forms made its first official appearance at a W.A.K.O. event (it had been held unofficially in Milan four years previously).  Musical Forms is a non-physical competition which sees the contestants fighting against imaginary foes using Martial Arts techniques.  Unlike the other categories on offer in London there were no weight classes.  More information on Musical Forms can be accessed on the W.A.K.O. website, although be aware that the rules may have changed since 1985.  Musical Forms in London was open to men only and by the end of the championships, there was only one recorded winner with the US's John Chung adding a gold to the unofficial one he won in Milan and his second at the London event (he won a bronze in the −69 kg Semi-Contact category as well).

Men's Musical Forms Medals Table

Overall Medals Standing (Top 5)

See also
List of WAKO Amateur World Championships
List of WAKO Amateur European Championships

References

External links
 WAKO World Association of Kickboxing Organizations Official Site

WAKO Amateur World Championships events
Kickboxing in the United Kingdom
1985 in kickboxing
Sport in the London Borough of Brent